The 2008 Spanish motorcycle Grand Prix was the second round of the 2008 MotoGP championship. It took place on the weekend of 28–30 March 2008 at the Circuito de Jerez located in Jerez de la Frontera, Spain. The MotoGP race was won by Dani Pedrosa, who finished ahead of Jorge Lorenzo, who started on pole position. Mika Kallio won the 250cc race after Álvaro Bautista and Marco Simoncelli, the two leaders, collided on the last lap. The 125cc race was won by Simone Corsi, ahead of Nicolás Terol and Bradley Smith, who started the race in pole position.

MotoGP classification

250cc classification

125cc classification

Championship standings after the race (MotoGP)

Below are the standings for the top five riders and constructors after round two has concluded. 

Riders' Championship standings

Constructors' Championship standings

 Note: Only the top five positions are included for both sets of standings.

References

Spanish motorcycle Grand Prix
Spanish
motorcycle